The Lichtenstein is a hill, in the southwestern Harz Foreland. It rises near Osterode am Harz in the Lower Saxon county of Göttingen.

There is a formation of Lower Bunter sandstone on the hill as well as the remains of Lichtenstein Castle. It is also the site of the Lichtenstein Cave.

Geography

Location 
The Lichtenstein rises southwest of the Harz mountains between Förste to the north, Osterode am Harz to the east-northeast, Ührde to the southeast and Dorste to the south-southwest; it belongs entirely to the Osterode borough, the town itself being 5.3  (as the crow flies) east-northeast of the summit. The Söse tributary, the Salza, flows past the hill to the west. The hill's southwestern spur is the  Badenhäuser Berg (221.6 m).

References 

Osterode am Harz